Doyo Dam is a rock-fill embankment dam located  north of Shinjō in the Okayama Prefecture, Japan. It creates the upper reservoir for the 1,500 MW Matanoagawa Pumped Storage Power Station while the Matanoagawa Dam creates the lower.

References

Dams in Okayama Prefecture
Rock-filled dams
Dams completed in 1986